The 2017 Vanderbilt Commodores baseball team represents Vanderbilt University during the 2017 NCAA Division I baseball season. The Commodores play their home games at Hawkins Field as a member of the Eastern Division of the Southeastern Conference. They are led by head coach Tim Corbin, in his 15th season at Vanderbilt. The Commodores would finish the regular season 33–21–1 overall, 15–13–1 in conference play and be invited to the 2017 NCAA Division I baseball tournament. Vanderbilt would beat Clemson to win the Clemson Regional, before losing to #1 Oregon State in the Corvallis Super Regional.

Previous season
The Commodores had a hot start to the 2016 season, being ranked as high as #2 before compiling a 40–15 regular season record, going 18–12 in the SEC. The Commodores finished ranked #10 in the nation and earned a #6 seed in the 2016 Southeastern Conference tournament. The Commodores went 2–2 and were eliminated by Texas A&M, the eventual champions. Following the SEC tournament, the Commodores hosted a regional in the NCAA Division I Baseball Tournament, part of the Louisville super regional. The season was marred by the death of freshman pitcher Donny Everett, who drowned the day before Vanderbilt was to take on Xavier University in their first regional game. Vanderbilt went 0–2 in the Nashville regional to end the season, falling to Xavier and Washington.

Personnel

Roster

Coaching staff

Schedule

Record vs. conference opponents

References

Vanderbilt
Vanderbilt Commodores baseball seasons
Vanderbilt
Vanderbilt Commodores baseball